Tazeh Kand (also Romanized as Tāzeh Kand) is a village in Razan Rural District, in the Central District of Razan County, Hamadan Province, Iran. At the 2006 census, its population was 267, in 61 families.

References 

Populated places in Razan County